Torasan may refer to:
 , a fictional character in the Japanese film Otoko wa Tsurai yo
 Torasan, the McCune–Reischauer transcription of Dorasan, South Korea